is a Japanese light novel series by Tomohiro Matsu, with illustrations by Kentaro Yabuki. A manga adaptation by Pochi Edoya began serialization online via Niconico Seiga website in November 2018. An anime television series adaptation by Children's Playground Entertainment aired from January to June 2020.

Synopsis
Makoto Shiranui dreams of becoming a magician and arrives in Tokyo to become a student of the world-famous illusionist Mamoru Hoshisato, a friend of his family. At the station, he is robbed by a beautiful thief, and when he arrives at the teacher's mansion, it turns out that his childhood friend Kana, who happens to be the daughter of his future teacher, has changed a lot. And now they do not understand each other at all.

Characters

Media

Light novel
Shueisha published four volumes of the light novel series under their Dash X Bunko imprint, with the latest volume published on November 25, 2015. The series is unfinished owing to the death of Tomohiro Matsu in May 2016. Shueisha later launched a new series, Hatena Illusion R, with the first volume being published on August 23, 2019.

Volume list

Hatena Illusion

Hatena Illusion R

Manga
Pochi Edoya launched a manga adaptation of the series in Niconico Seiga online website on November 27, 2018. Shueisha published the first tankōbon volume on January 17, 2020.

Anime
In March 2017, an anime adaptation of Hatena Illusion was announced at AnimeJapan. The adaptation was later announced in 2019 to be a television series animated by Children's Playground Entertainment and directed by Shin Matsuo, with Tatsuya Takahashi handling series composition, Ruizu Nakano designing the characters, and Kenichi Kuroda composing the music. The series aired from January 9 to June 3, 2020 on BS NTV, MBS, and Tokyo MX. Liyuu performed the series' opening theme song "Magic Words", while Aina Suzuki performed the series' ending theme song . Funimation licensed the series for a SimulDub. Due to "various reasons", the 12th and final episode was postponed to June 3 from its April broadcast.

References

External links
 

2014 Japanese novels
2019 Japanese novels
Anime and manga based on light novels
Dash X Bunko
Funimation
Light novels
Romantic comedy anime and manga
Seinen manga
Shueisha books
Shueisha manga
Unfinished novels